The Fresh Fish Award for Emerging Writers was established in 2006 by Brian O'Dea, an author from the province of Newfoundland and Labrador. The award supports emerging writers in Newfoundland and Labrador through financial and editing support, as well as recognition for their writing. The award is administered by the Writer's Alliance of Newfoundland and Labrador (WANL). Originally given out every year, the award became biennial in 2009. In 2011, NLCU - the largest credit union in Newfoundland and Labrador with a reputation for its commitment to local communities and organizations - became the corporate sponsor of the award, which is officially known as the NLCU Fresh Fish Award for Emerging Writers. Since its inception, the award has kick started the writing careers of many of its short-listed and winning writers, who were subsequently successful in having their works published.

Prize 
The winning author receives a cash prize of $5,200 and $1,000 towards professional editing services for the winning manuscript. Two runners-up receive a $1,000 cash prize each.

Guidelines and Eligibility 

In order to be eligible, an individual must be a member of WANL and a resident of the province of Newfoundland and Labrador. For the administration of these awards, WANL defines residents as individuals who meet one of two conditions. The first condition is that they have lived in the province for 12 months immediately prior to the release of publication of their written piece. The second is that they have lived in the province for at least 36 out of the previous 60 months, with no requirement for those months to be consecutive. The award cannot be received posthumously. 

The submitted manuscript must be both completed and unpublished. It must be in English and authored by a single individual. Only one submission per writer per year is allowed, however pieces that have been submitted once before to the Fresh Fish Awards are eligible to be submitted again. The same piece cannot be submitted more than twice.

Winners

References 

Newfoundland and Labrador awards
Canadian literary awards